Vo zaborav (in Macedonian Cyrillic: Во заборав) is the fourth studio album by Macedonian pop musician, Karolina Gočeva. The album was released in Macedonia and subsequently in Serbia, Montenegro, Bosnia & Herzegovina and Croatia under the Serbo-Croatian title, U Zaboravu.

Controversy
There have been accusations that the song "Se lažam sebe" is a cover of an Ozzy Osbourne song. The songwriter, Kaliopi, denied the claim and proved it in a court of law. The song was atop many singles charts in Macedonia, Serbia, Montenegro and Bosnia & Herzegovina.

Track listings
"Ova srce znae"
music: Mahir "Beat House" & Dino Šukaloarrangement: Dino Šukalolyrics: Dino Merlin & Vesna Malinova
"Umiram bez tebe"
music: Mirko Vukomanovićarrangement: Mirko Vukomanovićlyrics: Bajaga & Vesna Malinova
"Prvi mart"
music: Mirko Vukomanovićarrangement: Mirko Vukomanovićlyrics: Snežana Vukomanović & Kristijan Gabroski
"Slatka gorčina"
music: Mirko Vukomanovićarrangement: Mirko Vukomanovićlyrics: Snežana Vukomanović & Vesna Malinova
"Vo zaborav"
music: Mahir "Beat House" & Dino Šukaloarrangement: Dino Šukalolyrics: Dino Merlin & Vesna Malinova
"Plovime"
music: Ivica Brčioskiarrangement: Ivica Brčioskilyrics: Ivica Brčioski & Vesna Malinova
"Se lažam sebe"
music: Kaliopiarrangement: Darko Dimitrovlyrics: Kaliopi
"Ruža ružica"
music: Zlatko Oriǵanskiarrangement: Zlatko Oriǵanskilyrics: Zlatko Oriǵanski
"Ljubov"
music: Mladen Markovićarrangement: Mladen Markovićlyrics: Vesna Malinova
"Ušte samo eden den"
music: Kaliopiarrangement: Darko Dimitrovlyrics: Kaliopi

Bonus Tracks 

"Kao malo vode"
music: Vlatko Stefanovskiarrangement: Vlatko Stefanovskilyrics: Vlatko Stefanovski
"Kad mi nebo bude dom"
music: Vlatko Stefanovskiarrangement: Vlatko Stefanovskilyrics: Gibonni

Awards
Sunčane skale
 Video Of The Year (Se lažam sebe)
Golden Bug Awards
 Album Of The Year

References

2005 albums
Karolina Gočeva albums